Keiron Jenkins (born 17 February 1987) is a Welsh rugby union player.

Jenkins previously played for Bedwas RFC and he made his senior debut for Newport Gwent Dragons against Ulster on 3 September 2011.

Jenkins moved to Pontypridd RFC at the commencement of the 2012–2013 season.

References

External links 
 Newport Gwent Dragons profile
Pontypridd RFC profile

1987 births
Living people
Dragons RFC players
Pontypridd RFC players
Rugby union players from Rhondda Cynon Taf
Welsh rugby union players